Year 1413 (MCDXIII) was a common year starting on Sunday (link will display the full calendar) of the Julian calendar.

Events

January–December 
 March 21 – Henry V becomes King of England following the death of his father Henry IV.
 July 5 – Battle of Çamurlu: Mehmed I defeats his brother Musa, ending the Ottoman Interregnum.
 August 28 – The University of St Andrews in Scotland is chartered by papal bull.
 October 2 – The Kingdom of Poland and Grand Duchy of Lithuania sign the Union of Horodło.

Date unknown 
 Samogitia becomes the last region in Europe to be Christianized.
 The Annals of the Joseon Dynasty begin in Korea.

Births 
 February 24 – Louis, Duke of Savoy (d. 1465)
 September 8 – Catherine of Bologna, Italian cloistered nun (d. 1463)
 November 19 – Frederick II, Elector of Brandenburg (d. 1471)
 date unknown – Joanot Martorell, Spanish writer (d. 1468)

Deaths 
 January 25 – Maud de Ufford, Countess of Oxford (b. 1345)
 March 20 – Henry IV of England (b. 1367)
 July 5 – Musa Çelebi, Ottoman prince and co-ruler of the Ottoman Empire
 September 26 – Stephen III, Duke of Bavaria (b. 1337)
 October 6 – Dawit I of Ethiopia (b. 1382)
 December 26 – Michele Steno, Doge of Venice (b. 1331)

References